St. Dominic Savio Catholic High School is a Roman Catholic high school located in northern Austin, Texas, United States. The school, a part of the Roman Catholic Diocese of Austin, opened in August 2009. It is administered by the diocese.

History
After the closure of Austin's only diocesan Catholic high school in 1972, a private Catholic high school, Saint Michael's Catholic Academy, was built in 1984. In 2002 a second Catholic High School, San Juan Diego Catholic High School, was established by the diocese to serve low income students in Austin. With both located in southern Austin, and no Catholic high school to serve the fast-growing northern part of the metropolitan area, pressure had grown to start a new high school.  Groundbreaking was April 20, 2008  with construction to occur in three phases.  The first phase has capacity for 350 students, but when fully built out St. Dominic Savio High School will be one of the largest private schools in the area.  The high school is named after Saint Dominic Savio, the youngest non-martyr ever canonized.

Background
St. Dominic Savio Catholic High School, which is named for the Catholic saint, opened to incoming 9th and 10th graders on August 31, 2009.  The  campus is located in north Austin and is the first Catholic high school, and one of the few private high schools, in rapidly growing Williamson County.

Curriculum
St. Dominic Savio Catholic High School is a college preparatory diocesan high school. Over 40 PreAP, AP, and dual-enrollment courses are offered.

Athletics
St. Dominic Savio competes in the Texas Association of Private and Parochial Schools, fielding varsity teams in the following sports:

Baseball
Basketball
Cheerleading
Cross Country
Football
Golf
Soccer
Softball
Swimming
Tennis
Track
Volleyball

Academics and Fine arts
Saint Dominic Savio has an active fine arts program which includes annual performances of plays and musicals.  It also competes in the Texas Association of Private and Parochial Schools in Music and Art. In 2011, 2012, and 2013 Dominic Savio won the TAPPS 3A State Music championship. All of their large instrumental ensembles and four of their five choirs qualified for the state competition:
 Savio Symphony Orchestra
 Savio Concert Band
 Savio Strings
 Savio Jazz Ensemble
 Savio Faith Choir
 Savio Show Choir

Saint Dominic Savio was TAPPS 5A overall Academic and Speech champions in 2017 and 2018.

References

External links
Roman Catholic Diocese of Austin
 St. Dominic Savio Catholic High School

High schools in Austin, Texas
Catholic secondary schools in Texas
Preparatory schools in Texas
High schools in Williamson County, Texas